The Institute of Naval Medicine is the main research centre and training facility of the Royal Navy Medical Service.

History
The site was established in 1969 to research environmental health conditions for submariners in the Royal Navy.

At a safety conference on Saturday 25 March 1972 at the University of Birmingham, organised by the National Council of British Mountaineering, with around five hundred climbing experts present, Surgeon Commander Duncan Walters (August 1927 - August 2021) showed a film entitled Give Him Air, about a swimmer in Malta that was accidentally speared in the lung by a harpoon gun. The film showed the gruesome after-effects of the harpoon incident, which caused eight conference attendees to faint, and had to be carried outside.

In November 1973 a £200,000 environmental medical centre opened, which simulated life inside a submarine. From 12 November 1973, four sailors (medical ratings) were shut inside this for thirty days, to test atmospheric pollution.

J and P Engineering Reading Ltd developed a photo-sensitive radiation detector for the institute, later sold to the National Radiological Protection Board (NRPB) in Oxfordshire and for CERN.

At a conference in Aberdeen in September 1988, Surgeon Captain Ramsay Pearson, head of undersea medicine, said that recreational diving in the UK had too many accidents, due to decompression computers, which he claimed did not have built-in safety factors. The National Hyperbaric Centre in Aberdeen (built by the government in 1987) agreed with him.

The Channel 5 documentary Survivor featured the institute, and surviving cold temperatures on the Cascade Range, on Wednesday 28 January 1998.

In August 2000 the site sent four doctors and two staff to the Kursk submarine disaster in a team of twenty-seven from the UK.

Visits
Sir Ranulph Fiennes visited on Monday 11 October 1999, when he was put in an immersion tank.

Training
It trained medical staff for the Naval Emergency Monitoring Team at three sites at Gare Loch, Portsmouth and Plymouth, which worked with the Nuclear Accident Response Organisation (NARO) at the Clyde Submarine Base (HMNB Clyde)

In 1970s, nurses in the navy trained at the navy hospitals in Gosport and Plymouth; the Royal Naval School of Nursing began around 1962, in Gosport. There is longer a navy site at Plymouth, but there is a Ministry of Defence Hospital Unit - MODHU at Plymouth hospital; all medical assistants would complete 22 weeks of training at the RN Hospital in Gosport, followed by another 32 weeks at the RN hospitals at Gosport or Plymouth for naval (ship) medical assistants. Submarine medical assistants (MASM) would be trained at the institute, such as in radiation decontamination.

Medical assistants are trained at the Defence Medical Academy in Whittington, Staffordshire, with nuclear training at the Nuclear Department at HMS Sultan in Gosport, which will move to Scotland. The Department of Nuclear Science and Technology moved from London in October 1998.

Research

Drowning
The site has done much research into drowning, which kills 700–1000 a year in the UK, with a third being males aged 15–35. Surgeon Commander Frank Golden, Director of Research in the 1980s did much important investigations. Many able swimmers died, no more than 10 yards from refuge, from effects of cold water. Frank Golden later worked with Professor Mike Tipton at the University of Surrey Robens Institute.

So-called 'dry drowning' is caused by the shock of cold water. A possible cause is cold water causing the larynx to spasm. Animals have a 'diving response', but humans hyperventilate, and the heart beats too quickly due to a chemical imbalance.

Drowning is the third most common form of accidental death in the UK after road accidents and home injuries. It is often competent swimmers in canals, rivers or flooded quarries in spring or early summer, and there has not been much research on this form of drowning. Most deaths occur in the first three minutes, and those who last 15 minutes mostly last to 30 minutes. Admiral Frank Golden in the 1990s thought that the deaths were linked to the gasp reflex as found in cold showers. There is a big increase in blood pressure and heart rate. Uncontrolled rate breathing makes swimming impossible due to the cold shock response. Work had neen carried out with the University of Leeds on 'immersion hypothermia'.

Diving

In the 1990s, Surgeon Commander James Francis found 'nitrogen narcosis' below 30m of water depth. 
 James Francis became Head of Undersea Medicine and left the Navy in 1996.

The INM works with The Physiological Society, and staff have given lectures at the Society in London.

Seasickness
In November 1979 the site tested a new seasickness pill on HMS Broadsword, called cinnarizine, with reference to the previous medication hyoscine (scopolamine), and worked with the MRC

Women submariners
In 2010 the USA allowed women on its submarines but women submariners were not allowed in the UK as carbon dioxide in a submarine's atmosphere could damage a foetus.

In December 2011 women were allowed on submarines, with officers first then all women from 2015. All women would serve on the Astute class submarines from 2016. Women had been on surface ships since 1990. There are around 3420 females in the Royal Navy, about 9%.

Structure
It is situated in the south of Gosport. The Medical Officer-in-Charge is also the Dean of Naval Medicine.

Departments
 Diving and Hyperbaric Medicine, when known as the Undersea Medicine Department, it worked with the Submarine Escape Training Tank and HMS Reclaim
 Submarine and Radiation Medicine; the Naval Radiological Protection Service became the Defence R P S in 1982 which became DERA Radiation Protection Services
 Environmental and Industrial Hazards Laboratories, investigates drinking water
 Environmental Medicine and Science; the EMU - Environmental Medicine Unit had a Fitness Anthropometric Clinic
 Applied Physiology and Human Factors, investigates nutrition and supports the Defence Nutrition Advisory Service
 Acoustics and Vibration, has worked with the Institute of Sound and Vibration Research at the University of Southampton; the Royal Navy has an exemption from the Control of Vibration at Work Regulations 2005
 Cold Injury Clinic
 RNMS School, works with the Resuscitation Council UK on first aid

Medical Officers in Charge
 Sir James Watt 1969–72
 Sir John Rawlins 1972–77

See also
 Diving Diseases Research Centre in Devon
 Diving disorders
 RAF Centre of Aviation Medicine in Bedfordshire
 Institut de recherche biomédicale des armées, military medical research site in France

References

External links
 Institute of Naval Medicine

1969 establishments in the United Kingdom
Diving medicine organizations
Education in Hampshire
Gosport
Medical research institutes in the United Kingdom
Medical schools in the United Kingdom
Military medical research organizations of the United Kingdom
Military medical training establishments
Radiation protection organizations
Research institutes established in 1969
Research institutes in Hampshire
Royal Navy bases in Hampshire
Royal Navy Medical Service
Submarine education and training
Thermal medicine
Toxicology in the United Kingdom
Toxicology organizations
Underwater diving in the United Kingdom